Usza Wielka  is a village in the administrative district of Gmina Klukowo, within Wysokie Mazowieckie County, Podlaskie Voivodeship, in north-eastern Poland.

The village has an approximate population of 120.

References

Usza Wielka